Caligula was a Roman Emperor. 

His name is understood to be derived from Caligae, heavy-soled hobnailed military sandal-boots known for being issued to Roman legionary soldiers and auxiliaries throughout the Roman Republic.

Caligula may also refer to:

Film, theatre, and television
Caligula (play), a 1938 play by Albert Camus
Caligula, a 1968 tragedy by John Crowne
Caligula (film), a 1979 film about the emperor
Caligula 2 (film), a 1982 film about the emperor
Caligula (TV series), a 2018 anime television series

Music
Caligula (band), an Australian pop/rock band
Caligula (musical), a 2004 rock musical by Eric Svejcar
Caligula (Glanert), a 2006 opera by Detlev Glanert
Caligula, a 1671 opera by Giovanni Maria Pagliardi

Albums
Caligvla, a 2012 album by Ex Deo
Caligula (Anthony Jeselnik album), a 2013 album by Anthony Jeselnik
Caligula Theme Music, a 2014 album by Lee Bannon
Caligula, a 2008 album by Hästpojken
Caligula (Lingua Ignota album), a 2019 album by Lingua Ignota

Songs
"Caligula", a 1989 song by The Dickies from Second Coming
"Caligula", a song by Modey Lemon from Modey Lemon
"Caligula", a song by Macy Gray on On How Life Is

Other uses
Caligula (horse), an Thoroughbred racehorse
Caligula (moth), a genus of moths
Raziel (wrestler) or Caligula, professional wrestler

See also
Caligola (music project), Italian artists' collective
The Caligula Effect, a 2016 role-playing video game
Emperor Magus Caligula (born 1973), vocalist for Dark Funeral